Farz is a 2001 Indian Hindi-language action thriller film starring Sunny Deol, Preity Zinta and Jackie Shroff.

Plot 
Mumbai is being terrorized by a dreaded criminal Gawa Firozi (Jackie Shroff) and his brother Sikander (Mukesh Tiwari). ACP Arjun Singh (Om Puri) and his brother-in-law, Tayaji (Dara Singh), work with the crime branch of the city's police department, but when Tayaji is killed while trying to save the Chief Minister from Gawa's attack, Arjun is devastated by his death. Arjun's wife Rukmani (Farida Jalal), daughter Kajal (Preity Zinta) and son Rahul are also equally shattered, and Arjun is fearful that the same person who killed his brother-in-law will come after him or his family.

While Arjun is still mourning Tayaji's death, he is told that a new officer ACP Karan Singh (Sunny Deol) will be joining the department as a substitute for Tayaji. Just the next day at work, Arjun is informed that some criminals have entered a college and have taken some students as hostages including his daughter Kajal. Arjun reaches the spot and while he is negotiating with the assailants, Karan storms into the building and single-handedly wipes out all the perpetrators and manages to save Kajal who instantly falls in love with him. Arjun is not happy with Karan's methods of dealing with criminals as Karan rarely leaves anyone alive at the crime scene. To cap Arjun's frustrations, Karan starts reciprocating Kajal's feelings and a flustered Arjun starts venting out his frustration on petty offenders before eventually being stopped by Karan.

Over the next few days, Arjun and Karan raid several hideouts and illicit ammunition factories belonging to Gawa and Sikandar but are unable to do much since Sikandar is an influential person in the city. One day Kajal's friend who was in an illicit relationship with Sikandar is killed by him after she tries to blackmail him into marrying her. While escaping, Sikandar bumps into Kajal who informs Karan and Arjun about the murder. Karan asks Kajal to identify the killer. However, Arjun advises against it fearing for his family.

Meanwhile Karan and Kajal's romance reaches a crescendo and the two promptly marry, against Arjun's wishes though with Rukmini's blessing. However, on their first night, the couple are attacked by Sikandar and his cronies. They manage to escape unhurt and Karan pursues and captures Sikandar, presenting him before the judge the next day. While Sikandar is being transferred to the prison, Gawa attacks the police convoy and frees Sikandar. A gunfight ensues, and Karan shoots Sikandar and kills him but is unable to kill Gawa as he runs out of bullets. Gawa is captured and vows to avenge his brother's death while Karan receives widespread admiration from the citizens as well as his colleagues and seniors and is promoted to DCP making Arjun even more jealous of him.

Some time later, Gawa manages to escape by faking his own death. Karan and Kajal are shown to be doting on an orphan named Kabir and are good friends with Kabir's guardian, a catholic priest who runs an orphanage. Gawa decides to use this to his advantage. He murders the priest and writes a fake suicide note indicting Karan which says that the priest, with Karan's help ran the orphanage as a front for child trafficking. As a result, Karan is set to face a CBI enquiry. Gawa then starts showing up in front of Karan at unusual instances and even enters his house and drugs and molests Kajal when she's alone one night. These events take a heavy toll on Karan's life, driving him to near madness. To top it all, Karan is dismissed from service and takes to drinking, consequently becoming abusive towards Kajal, putting their marriage in jeopardy. Karan's informer Taxi (Johny Lever) who worked for Gawa earlier, sympathizes with him since he wants revenge for his brother, who was killed by Gawa for no fault of his. One night, when Karan is roaming around in a drunken state along with Taxi, the duo sense that they are being followed. Taxi realizes that it's Gawa who's following them and raises the alarm. But Gawa shoots Taxi and escapes after throwing the gun at Karan, framing him for the murder.

Karan now finds himself in a tight spot, dealing with his crumbling marriage, his duty-bound father-in-law who is leaving no stone unturned to get him and worst of all, Gawa Firozi, who is still roaming scot-free. Only Rukmani, who considers Karan as her own son openly states that she believes he is innocent and will support him no matter what. Somehow, Karan is able to meet Kajal in the temple on the day of Karwa Chauth. Kajal tells him that she still believes in him and knows that he is innocent and also that she is observing a fast for him during the day. Karan tells her that he is going to go all-out after Gawa Firozi and Kajal wishes him luck. Just as they finish their conversation, Arjun lays siege to the temple ordering Karan to surrender. However, Kajal intervenes just as Arjun points a gun at Karan, and Karan escapes, leaving Arjun fuming.

However, Karan's cup of woes is not yet full and he receives a final bolt when Kabir informs him that Kajal has been kidnapped by Gawa Firozi. Furious, Karan infiltrates Gawa's hideout, killing many of his henchmen and finds Kajal tied up next to a mechanical blade. Karan fights Gawa, who reminds Karan of his brother's death and says that he too will see his wife die right before his eyes. However, Karan suddenly gains the upper hand and beats up Gawa telling him that his brother was a criminal who deserved no sympathy and that Gawa himself will also meet the same fate now. Karan saves Kajal and chases Gawa who has boarded a helicopter. Karan manages to cling on the threshold of the helicopter and it takes off just as Arjun arrives at the scene with a huge police force in tow. During the fight Karan falls off taking Gawa down along with him. Karan is saved by a hanging wire while Gawa lands onto a minefield below which blows up, killing him for once and for all. Karan and Kajal reunite and Arjun, smiling, approaches them, imitating Karan's habit of munching on a carrot, indicating that he has accepted Karan.

Cast 
Sunny Deol as DCP Karan Singh
Preity Zinta as Kajal Singh
Jackie Shroff as Gawa Firozi
Farida Jalal as Rukmani Singh
Johnny Lever as Taxi
Om Puri as ACP Arjun Singh
Dara Singh as Tayaji
Mukesh Tiwari as Sikander Firozi
Pooja Batra as herself in a song
Achyut Potdar as Police Commissioner

Production
The outdoor scenes of Farz were shot in Bernese Oberland in central Switzerland. The film was made on a budget of $3 million.

Soundtrack
All songs are written by Sameer Anjaan.

Reception
Suparn Verma of Rediff criticised the film for being heavily influenced by Lethal Weapon and Ricochet including the climax scene from Metro. Nikhat Kazmi of Filmfare rated it 2.5 out of 5 stars.

References

External links
 

2001 films
2000s Hindi-language films
Indian action thriller films
2001 action thriller films
Films scored by Uttam Singh
Indian films about revenge
Films directed by Raj Kanwar